The third season of Everybody Loves Raymond ran in the United States from September 21, 1998 to May 24, 1999.

Production 

The third season of Everybody Loves Raymond was produced by HBO Independent Productions, creator Philip Rosenthal's company Where's Lunch, and David Letterman's Worldwide Pants. Patricia Heaton was pregnant with her fourth son during filming of the season, 
which the producers and directors try to hide, such as with her holding a large telephone book in the season's premiere. 

On March 22, 1999, Peter Boyle suffered a heart attack on set; he initially refused to go to the hospital, despite strong insistence from the paramedics, but changed his mind after Rosenthal told the actor he would be liable if Boyle died. While he survived, he would've been dead if he'd arrived at the hospital fifteen minutes later. This resulted in Boyle being absent for two episodes in order to recover. Despite media coverage reporting that he would likely appear in the season finale, this didn't happen. The dance choreography in "Dancing with Debra" was done by Travis Payne, who become popular a year before after choreographing a Gap advertisement. Some content of the season made the airwaves despite disapproval from CBS, such as the use of the word "ass" in "Big Shots" and the entirety of "Halloween Candy."

Cast

Main 
 Ray Romano as Raymond "Ray" Barone
 Patricia Heaton as Debra (née Whelan) Barone
 Brad Garrett as Robert Barone
 Doris Roberts as Marie Barone
 Peter Boyle as Francis "Frank" Barone
 Madylin Sweeten as Alexandra "Ally" Barone
 Sawyer Sweeten as Geoffrey Barone 
 Sullivan Sweeten as Michael Barone

Recurring 
 Monica Horan as Amy McDougall
 Andy Kindler as Andy
 Jon Manfrellotti as Gianni 
 Kevin James as Doug Heffernan
 Shamsky II
 Katherine Helmond as Lois Whelan 
 Robert Culp as Warren Whelan
 Sherri Shepherd as Judy
 Victor Raider-Wexler as Stan
 Len Lesser as Garvin
 Charles Durning as Father Hubley
 Joseph V. Perry as Nemo
 Tina Arning as Angelina
 John David Conti as Abe Warchiser
 David Hunt as Bill Parker

Reception

Ratings 
Beginning season two, Raymond was in competition with the Fox series Ally McBeal (1997–2002); while media experts expected Ally McBeal to garner better ratings than Raymond through its entire run, this was ultimately not the case. By December 1998, in comparison to the same month of the previous season, the series was 6% higher in its average rating of 10.5 and a 16 share, and 23% with its 18–49 demographic rating of 5.3/13. A June 1999 feature from The New York Times reported the series to be "one of the biggest comedies on television" and also a part of a mainstream television trend of shows without bankable stars becoming hits. "The Sitter" received 363,000 male viewers who were 12 to 17 years old and was the highest-rated non-sports show in the demographic that week.

Reviews 
Everybody Loves Raymond topped Entertainment Weekly's list of the best series of 1998: "This organic vision of family life as a chain reaction of comic agita is vividly rendered by a flawless ensemble," and the "comedy is rooted in characters as deeply drawn as those of TV’s best dramas." In October 1998, an Omaha World-Herald critic included Everybody Loves Raymond as one of his "shows I would like to watch nearly every night of the week." The State Journal-Register, in the middle of the TV season, claimed the show's third season to be the best of all Raymond years so far, also calling "Halloween Candy" a "particularly funny" episode for the Frankenstein costumes of Frank and Robert.

Reviewing the fall 1998 television season, Chicago Tribune critic Steve Johnson wrote the show was a "deserved hit" for CBS. Everybody Loves Raymond topped Daily Herald critic Ted Cox's list of the best shows of the 1998–99 season: "the family sitcom cut dangerously close to the bone on how and why the family unit is at once so aggravating and enduring. And Brad Garrett established himself as the single funniest man on TV, displaying unexpected range as a physical comedian in two hilarious dance sequences at the beginning and the end of the season." Upon the 1998–99 TV season's closure, The Tampa Tribune named Raymond "a contender for the best sitcom on television, appealing to young and old viewers." The Star Tribune also praised the ensemble acting in the season, and the Hartford Courant called it one of the few "signs of life" in a landscape of series focus on demographics and profits over quality.

Three episodes of the season made The Star-Ledger's unranked list of top ten Everybody Loves Raymond episodes: "Frank's Tribute" for its inclusion of both the "funniest" and "most poignant" sequences of the entire show, "Robert's Date" for Garrett's dancing and date slang, and "How They Met" for being the show's best flashback episode.

Awards 

Everybody Loves Raymond's third season was the series' first to garner Primetime Emmy nominations. According to The New York Times, "many critics felt [it] had been overlooked in its first two seasons." The show itself was nominated for Outstanding Comedy Series, with acting nominations for Romano for Outstanding Lead Actor in a Comedy Series, Heaton for Outstanding Lead Actress in a Comedy Series, Boyle for Outstanding Supporting Actor in a Comedy Series, and Roberts for Outstanding Supporting Actress in a Comedy Series. Will Mackenzie was nominated for Outstanding Directing for a Comedy Series for his work on "Robert's Date." Patricia Bennett's editing of the episode was also nominated for an Eddie Award for Best Edited Half-Hour Series for Television, while Eric Cohen was nominated for a Humanitas Prize in the 30-minute show category for writing "Frank's Tribute." 

In a 1999 ceremony, the season was nominated for six Q awards by the Viewers for Quality Television, such as Best Quality Comedy Series, Best Actor in a Quality Comedy Series for Romano, Best Actress in a Quality Comedy Series for Heaton, Best Supporting Actor in a Quality Comedy Series for Boyle, Best Supporting Actress in a Quality Comedy Series for Roberts, and the same award for Garrett. That year, all of these nominations were the only ones for CBS, and the season tied with The Practice's (1997–2004) second season for the highest amount of nominations that year. Raymond also ended up obtaining the most wins, with the season winning the Comedy Series award, Heaton taking home her Actress award, Romano receiving his Best Actor award, and Roberts winning the Supporting Actress accolade for a second year in a row.

At the fifth Screen Actors Guild Award ceremony, the lead actors were nominated for Outstanding Performance by an Ensemble in a Comedy Series for acting in the season. Madylin Sweeten was nominated for a Youth in Film award for Best Performance in a TV Comedy Series: Supporting Young Actress and a YoungStar Award for Best Performance by a Young Actress in a Comedy TV Series. Roberts also won Funniest Supporting Female Performer in a TV Series at the 1999 American Comedy Awards, Romano nominated for Funniest Male Performer in a TV Series (Leading Role). He also won the honor of Individual Achievement in Comedy at the 15th TCA Awards, the same event that nominated the season not just for Outstanding Achievement in Comedy but also Program of the Year. The season was also nominated for a TV Guide Award for Favorite Comedy Series.

Episodes

References

Citations

Works cited 

1998 American television seasons
1999 American television seasons
Everybody Loves Raymond seasons